Richard Lee Stuart (November 7, 1932 – December 15, 2002), nicknamed "Dr. Strangeglove", was an American professional baseball player. He played in Major League Baseball (MLB) as a first baseman from 1958 to 1966 then, played in the Nippon Professional Baseball (NPB) league from 1967 to 1968 before returning to play one final season in MLB in 1969.

A two-time All-Star player, Stuart was notable for being an integral member of the 1960 Pittsburgh Pirates team that upset the New York Yankees to win the 1960 World Series and, for being the 1963 American League RBI champion.

Early years
Stuart was born in San Francisco, California, but his family soon relocated to San Carlos and he attended Sequoia High School in neighboring Redwood City. Stuart declined two scholarships to play college baseball when he signed with the Pittsburgh Pirates in June  for a $10,000 bonus. The outfielder soon emerged as one of the top sluggers in their farm system. He also led the league in runs batted in (121), runs (115) and total bases (292).

Equally stunning was his league leading 171 strikeouts.

His fielding also proved to be something of a liability. The Pirates unsuccessfully tried him at third base with the Atlanta Crackers in  before shifting him to first base in 1958. Stuart clubbed 31 home runs in 80 games for the Salt Lake City Bees when he received his call to the majors in July.

Pittsburgh Pirates
Stuart made his major league debut with the Pirates on July 10, 1958, at the age of 25. With the Pirates trailing 8–5, Stuart hit a two-run home run in the ninth inning of his major league debut to bring his team within a run. The following day, he hit a grand slam off Moe Drabowsky to lead his team to a 7–2 victory over the Chicago Cubs. Over the remainder of the season, Stuart would bat .268 with 48 RBIs. Despite being called up halfway through the season, and being used in a lefty/righty platoon with Ted Kluszewski, Stuart's sixteen home runs was third best on the team. He also led the league in errors committed by a first baseman (16) for the first of seven consecutive years.

As the Pirates' full time first baseman, Stuart improved to .307 with eight home runs and nineteen RBIs. His 27 home runs and 78 RBIs led the team, while his .297 batting average tied for the team lead with catcher Smoky Burgess.

Fueled by an MVP season from shortstop Dick Groat, and the emergence of young star Roberto Clemente, the 1960 Pirates sailed to the NL pennant by seven games over the Milwaukee Braves. In their 1960 World Series victory over the New York Yankees, Stuart was held to three singles in twenty at bats with no RBIs or runs scored. Stuart was in the on deck circle as a pinch hitter when Bill Mazeroski hit the ninth-inning home run off Ralph Terry that won the World Series.

There were two All-Star games in 1961; Stuart was part of both NL squads. In the July 11 game at Candlestick Park, Stuart doubled in his only at bat. in the July 31 contest at Fenway Park, Stuart grounded out in his only at bat. His 35 home runs and 117 RBIs far and away led the Pirates, while he batted over .300 for the only time in his career (.301). He also led the NL with 121 strikeouts.

Following a slow start to his  season, Stuart found himself losing playing time to rookie prospect Donn Clendenon. After the season, Stuart and pitcher Jack Lamabe were traded to the Boston Red Sox for Jim Pagliaroni and Don Schwall.

Boston Red Sox
Stuart's physical resemblance to Red Sox legend Ted Williams immediately endeared him to fans. Endearing him even more to Bosox fans was the fact that through the first 26 games of the 1963 season, Stuart had five home runs and seventeen RBIs without committing an error. That streak ended abruptly, when Stuart had errors in both games of a May 15 doubleheader with the Los Angeles Angels. His .253 batting average, seventeen home runs and fifty RBIs at the All-Star break earned him a second-place finish to the Yankees' Joe Pepitone in fan balloting, but he was left off the team by American League manager Ralph Houk. He was, however, named the first baseman on the Sporting News AL All-Star Team.

He would earn a degree of revenge on Houk on August 15, when he hit his thirtieth home run of the season, making him the first player to hit thirty home runs in a season in both the NL and the AL. For the season, he would finish second to the Minnesota Twins' Harmon Killebrew in the AL home run race (45 to 42). While he would go on to lead the AL with 118 RBIs and 319 total bases, he would also lead major league first basemen with 29 errors, which remains both Stuart's career high and the Boston Red Sox single season record. By season's end, he had been dubbed "Stone Fingers" by none other than Hank Aaron. Despite his well-documented defensive struggles, on June 28, Stuart became the first first-baseman in major league history to record three assists in one inning.

The following season, Stuart would become far better known as "Dr. Strangeglove", a play on the 1964 film Dr. Strangelove. Despite his 24 errors at first, Stuart still mashed with the best of them. He hit 33 home runs and was second in the AL (to the Baltimore Orioles' Brooks Robinson) with 114 RBIs.

Philadelphia Phillies
In need of starting pitching, the Red Sox dealt Stuart to the Philadelphia Phillies at the start of the Winter meetings for left hander Dennis Bennett. Following a 6-for-14 four game series in Los Angeles against the Dodgers, Stuart raised his batting average to .297. He followed that up with an 0-for-14 slump that saw his average drop to .216, and drew the ire of manager Gene Mauch. Stuart batted .234 with 28 home runs and 95 RBIs his only season in Philadelphia.

On October 27,  the Phillies acquired Gold Glove first baseman Bill White, Bob Uecker and Stuart's former Pirates teammate Dick Groat from the St. Louis Cardinals for Pat Corrales, Alex Johnson and Art Mahaffey. Four months later, Stuart was traded to the New York Mets for minor leaguers Wayne Graham, Bobby Klaus and Jimmie Schaffer.

1966 season
The Mets moved 21 year old All-Star Ed Kranepool into a left field platoon with Ron Swoboda in order to make room for Stuart at first base. However, once Kranepool demonstrated that he was a terrible left fielder, and Stuart committed six errors by June 5, the idea was abandoned. The Mets released Stuart on June 15 with a .218 average, four home runs and thirteen RBIs. Shortly afterwards, he went from worst to first, signing as a free agent with the Los Angeles Dodgers. Though his role with the Dodgers was far more limited than Stuart was used to in his major league career, he returned to the post season for only the second time in his career. He appeared as a pinch hitter in games one and four of the 1966 World Series against the Baltimore Orioles, flying out to deep right center in game one, and striking out in game four.

Taiyo Whales
Prior to his trade to the Mets, Stuart seriously considered playing in Japan. With no Major League offers on the table for the 1967 season, he signed with Nippon Professional Baseball's Taiyo Whales. After an impressive first season with the Whales (.280 avg., 33 HR, 79 RBI), Stuart dipped to a .217 average, with sixteen home runs and forty RBIs his second season. He became known as "Moby Dick" while playing in Japan.).

He returned to the major leagues with the California Angels in 1969, but after 22 games in which he batted .157 with just one home run, he was released on June 3. He finished out the season with the Pacific Coast League's Phoenix Giants before retiring at the age of 36.

Career statistics

In January , almost four years after Stuart's retirement, it was noted that the not yet instituted designated hitter rule "would have suited Dr. Strangeglove perfectly". Other, less well known but equally unflattering nicknames included "Iron Glove" and, in a more literary vein, "The Ancient Mariner", a reference to an opening line in the Samuel Taylor Coleridge poem The Rime of the Ancient Mariner: specifically, "It is an ancient mariner, And he stoppeth one of three".

In their book, The Great American Baseball Card Flipping, Trading and Bubble Gum Book, Brendan C. Boyd and Fred C. Harris wrote an essay on Stuart's notoriously poor fielding. An excerpt: "Every play hit his way was an adventure, the most routine play a challenge to his artlessness. It is hard to describe this to anyone who has not seen it, just as it is hard to describe Xavier Cugat or Allen Ludden. Stu once picked up a hot dog wrapper that was blowing toward his first base position. He received a standing ovation from the crowd. It was the first thing he had managed to pick up all day, and the fans realized it could very well be the last".

Personal life
Stuart had a daughter, Debbie Lea, from his first marriage, and two sons, Richard Lee Jr. and Robert Lance from his second marriage to Lois. He was a member of the Screen Guild Extra Union, and appeared as an extra in the film D-Day the Sixth of June, and on the television shows Navy Log and Badge 714. While with the Red Sox, Stuart began doing a sports TV show entitled Stuart on Sports Sunday nights after the news. He also hosted like-named shows while with the Phillies and Mets.

Stuart died of cancer on December 15, 2002 in Redwood City, California at the age of 70.

See also
List of Major League Baseball career home run leaders

References

Further reading

Articles

Ledger staff. "New Pro Ballplayer". Mexico Ledger. July 6, 1951.
Biederman, Les. "The Scoreboard". The Pittsburgh Press. March 4, 1957.
Hernon, Jack. "Stuart Slams Homer As Pirates Win, 7-4". The Pittsburgh Post-Gazette. March 11, 1957.
Associated Press. "Stuart, Bilko Clash Tonight in Swat Duel". The Desert Sun. April 16, 1957.
Brown, Bruce. "From the Sidelines". The San Bernardino Sun. April 17, 1957.
AP Wirephoto. "Homers and Strikes Out". The San Bernardino Sun. April 20, 1957.
Associated Press. "King Sticks With Stuart; Star's Pilot Convinced on Ability". The San Bernardino Sun. April 25, 1957
Russell, Fred. "Sidelines: Atlanta's Non-Shrinking Violet, Via Pittsburgh and Hollywood". Nashville Banner. May 27, 1957.
Johnson, Raymond. "One Man's Opinion: Atlanta's Long-Hitting Stuart Has Other Dramatic Talents". The Tennessean. May 29, 1957.
Abrams, Al. "Sidelights on Sports". The Pittsburgh Post-Gazette. July 14, 1958.
Hernon, Jack. "Friend Gets 20th, Beats Giants, 6-4: Stuart's 2-Run Homer in 10th Breaks Deadlock". The Pittsburgh Post-Gazette. September 11, 1958. pp. 1  and 28.
Cernkovic, Rudy (UPI). "'Bad Boy' Stuart Now 'Good Boy': Woman's Touch". The Desert Sun. September 18, 1958.
Biederman, Les. "The Scoreboard: Meet Ball, Homers Will Come, Clemente Assures Stuart". The Pittsburgh Press. April 18, 1959.
Biederman, Les. "Loss to Cards Dims Stuart's Long Home Run; Tape Measure Job in Ninth Inning Brings Bucs Close". The Pittsburgh Press. May 2, 1959.
Biederman, Les. "Stuart Makes Buc History: Dick's Homer First Ever Hit Over CF Wall; Ball Disappears At 457-Foot Mark, Cubs Win, 10-5". The Pittsburgh Press. June 6, 1959.
Biederman, Les. "Scoreboard: Boost Dick Stuart Movement Getting Support Among Fans; Salesman's Plea to Get Behind Slugger and Thus Help Pirates Favorably Received". The Pittsburgh Press. March 3, 1960.
Biederman, Les. "Stuart Gives  Pirate 1 For Road: 3-Run Homer Nips LA in Ninth, 3-2; Milwaukee Next". The Pittsburgh Press. June 8, 1962.
Grayson, Harry. "Dick Stuart Is Termed Biggest Thing In Boston Since Williams". The Ogdensburg Advance-News. March 31, 1963.
Green, Bob (AP). "Dick Stuart Equals Zeke Bonura's Mark". The Santa Cruz Sentinel. August 23, 1963.
Down, Fred (UPI). "Phillies Expect Big Things Of Stuart". The Prescott Evening Courier. February 22, 1965.
Bock, Hal. "Dick Stuart's Homers Give Phillies Win". The Gettysburg Times. March 19, 1965.
Biederman, Les. "The Scoreboard: Dick Stuart 'Having a Ball' Playing Baseball in Japan". The Pittsburgh Press. June 14, 1967.
Richman, Milton  (UPI). "'Pretty Fair Year': Dick Stuart's Lot in Japan". The Madera Daily Tribune. August 24, 1967.
"Weekend TV Key". The Pittsburgh Post-Gazette. August 26, 1967.
Feeney, Charley. "Roamin' Around: Tales of Big Stu". The Pittsburgh Post-Gazette. February 29, 1968.
United Press International. "Did Stuart Learn Humility in Japan?". The San Bernardino Sun. March 22, 1969.
Couch, Dick. "Stuart Hits Grand Slam But Angels Lose On Errors". The Owosso Argus-Press. April 2, 1969.
Rees, Ryan. "Stuart Prefers California to Japan". The San Bernardino Sun. May 3, 1969.
Carry, Peter. "Phoenixes of the World, Arise!". Sports Illustrated. August 18, 1969. pp. 46–49.
Fuhrer, Phil. "Extra Innings: Stu Still Aflame". The San Bernardino Sun. August 12, 1970.
Young, Dick. "Dick Stuart and the Almost Perfect Game". The San Bernardino Sun. August 8, 1974.
Abrams, Al. "Sidelights On Sports: Stone Fingers Collector Now". The Pittsburgh Post-Gazette. April 21, 1976.

Books
Jenkinson, Bill. Baseball's Ultimate Power: Ranking the All-Time Greatest Long-Distance Home Run Hitters. Guilford, CT: Lyons Press. pp. 80-83. .

External links

Dick Stuart at SABR (Baseball BioProject)
Dick Stuart at Baseball Almanac
Dick Stuart at Historic Baseball
Dick Stuart at The Deadball Era

1932 births
2002 deaths
Águilas Cibaeñas players
American expatriate baseball players in the Dominican Republic
American expatriate baseball players in Japan
American expatriate baseball players in Mexico
American League RBI champions
Atlanta Crackers players
Baseball players from San Francisco
Billings Mustangs players
Boston Red Sox players
California Angels players
Deaths from cancer in California
Hollywood Stars players
Lincoln Chiefs players
Los Angeles Dodgers players
Major League Baseball first basemen
Modesto Reds players
National League All-Stars
New Orleans Pelicans (baseball) players
New York Mets players
Nippon Professional Baseball first basemen
People from Culver City, California
People from Redwood City, California
People from San Carlos, California
Philadelphia Phillies players
Phoenix Giants players
Pittsburgh Pirates players
Salt Lake City Bees players
Taiyō Whales players
Tigres del México players